The 349th Night Fighter Squadron (349th NFS) is an inactive United States Air Force unit which specialized in training airmen to utilize night fighters as nighttime interceptors.   Its last assignment was with the 481st Night Fighter Operational Training Group, based at Hammer Field, California. First activated in October 1942, the unit was inactivated on 31 March 1944.

The squadron was one of the first dedicated Night Fighter Operational Training Squadron of the Air Force.  The squadron trained newly activated night fighter squadrons who were deployed overseas into combat until its inactivation in March 1944 due to a re-alignment of training unit designations.

History
The squadron was formed in October 1942 from elements of the 81st Fighter Squadron as part of the Army Air Force School of Applied Tactics (AAFSAT) Fighter Command School at Orlando Army Air Base, Florida. Its personnel being veteran American pilots trained by the Royal Air Force in night interception operations. It was initially equipped with three Douglas DB-7s and twenty-three Douglas P-70s. Shortages in operational flying aircraft, spare parts and other issues kept flying training very rudimentary for the squadrons first classes that graduated in December 1942.

As 1943 progressed additional aircraft and equipment arrived and the program expanded.   In September, the first American-built dedicated night fighter began to arrive, the Northrup YP-61 Black Widow and a few production P-61As. In January 1944 the entire program moved to Hammer Field, California and was placed under IV Fighter Command.  The move placed the squadron near Northrop manufacturing facility at Hawthorne, California and most programmed P-61 squadrons were planned for operations in the Pacific and China Burma India Theaters.

In March 1944 the 348th was disbanded when the AAF found that standard military units, based on relatively inflexible tables of organization were proving less well adapted to the training mission.  Accordingly, a more functional system was adopted in which each base was organized into a separate numbered unit during a reorganization of units in the United States. The squadron's personnel and equipment were transferred to Squadron B of the 450th Army Air Forces Base Unit (Night Fighter Replacement Training Unit).

Lineage
 Constituted 349th Night Fighter Squadron on 1 October 1942
 Activated on 1 October 1942
 Disbanded on 31 March 1944

Assignments
 Fighter Command School, Army Air Force School of Applied Tactics (AAFSAT), 21 January 1943
 Air Defense Department, AAFSAT, 18 February 1943
 Night Fighter Division, AAFSAT, 1 April 1943
 Attached to 481st Night Fighter Operational Training Group, 17 July 1943
 481st Night Fighter Operational Training Group, 26 July 1943 – 31 March 1944

Stations
 Orlando Army Air Base, Florida, 4 October 1942
 Kissimmee Army Airfield, Florida, 1 January 1943
 Hammer Army Airfield, California, 16 January – 31 March 1944

Aircraft Assigned
 A-20/DB-7/P-70 Havoc, 1942–1944
 B-18 Bolo, 1943–1944
 YP-61 Black Widow, 1943–1944

See also

 Operational - Replacement Training Units

References

External links

Military units and formations in California
Night Fighter squadrons of the United States Army Air Forces